Fire (Hindi: आग) is a 1996 Indo-Canadian erotic romantic drama film written and directed by Deepa Mehta, starring Shabana Azmi and Nandita Das. It is the first installment of Mehta's Elements trilogy; it is succeeded by Earth (1998) and Water (2005).

The film is loosely based on Ismat Chughtai's 1942 story, "Lihaaf" ("The Quilt"). Fire is one of the first mainstream Bollywood films to explicitly show homosexual relations, and the first to feature a lesbian relationship. After its 1998 release in India, activists staged several protests, setting off a flurry of public dialogue around issues such as homosexuality and freedom of speech.

Plot
The film opens with young Radha sitting in a mustard field with her parents. Her mother tells her a tale of a person who wanted to see the ocean, but Radha says that she does not understand the moral of the story.

The film flashes forward to Sita, a newly married woman on honeymoon with her husband Jatin, who is distant and shows little interest in Sita. Jatin is in a typical joint-family arrangement – he lives with his older brother Ashok, his sister-in-law Radha, his paralysed mother Biji and the family servant Mundu. Ashok and Jatin run a small store that sells food and rents videotapes.

Jatin shows no care for Sita, and she learns that he only agreed to the arranged marriage in order to put an end to Ashok's nagging. Jatin continues to date his modern Asian girlfriend, and Sita does not rebuke him. The rest of Jatin's home is not rosy either. Biji is immobile and speechless after a stroke, and Sita and Radha must constantly attend to her. Sita spends her days slaving in the hot kitchen, and finds herself lonely and frustrated at night because Jatin is out with his girlfriend. She yearns to break out of this stifling situation.

It is revealed that Radha faces a similar problem. Many years ago, Ashok had come under the influence of Swamiji, a local religious preacher, who teaches that desires are the cause of suffering and must be suppressed. Ashok is completely taken by these monastic teachings and suppresses all his desires. He also donates large sums from the meager store income to treat the Swamiji's hydrocele condition. The Swamiji teaches that sexual contact is permitted only as a means for procreation, and Radha is infertile. Accordingly, Ashok aims to stamp out all his desires and has not slept with Radha for the past thirteen years. He puts Radha through an excruciating ritual in which they lie motionless next to each other whenever he wants to test his resolve. Radha is racked with guilt over her inability to have children and driven to frustration by the ritual.

While the older Radha remains bound by tradition and subdued into silence, the younger Sita refuses to accept her fate. Sita's attitude slowly spills over onto Radha, who becomes slightly more assertive. One evening, shunned by their husbands and driven to desperation by their unfulfilled longings, Radha and Sita seek solace in each other and become lovers. Overjoyed at finding satisfaction in this manner, they continue it in secret. They eventually realise their love for each other and start looking for ways to move out. The pair's daily antics and adventures are witnessed by Biji, who disapproves, but is unable to stop them. After some time, Mundu becomes aware of their relationship, and he causes Ashok to walk in on Radha and Sita.

Ashok is horrified. He is also shattered when he finds this incident has stoked his own long-dormant desire. Sita decides to pack her belongings and leave the house immediately, while Radha stays behind in order to talk to her husband. The women promise to meet each other later that night. Ashok confronts Radha, who overcomes her subservience and pours out her emotions. Amid this argument, Radha's sari catches fire, and Ashok angrily watches her burn without helping. Radha puts out the flames and recalls her mother's advice from when she was young – she can finally see her ocean.

An injured Radha leaves Ashok, moving out in order to join Sita.

Cast

 Nandita Das as Sita
 Shabana Azmi as Radha
 Karishma Jhalani as young Radha
 Ramanjit Kaur as Young Radha's mother
 Dilip Mehta as Young Radha's father
 Javed Jaffrey as Jatin
 Vinay Pathak as Guide at Taj Mahal
 Kushal Rekhi as Biji
 Ranjit Chowdhry as Mundu
 Kulbhushan Kharbanda as Ashok
 Alice Poon as Julie
 Ram Gopal Bajaj as Swamiji
 Ravinder Happy as Oily man in video shop
 Devyani Saltzman as Girl in video shop
 Sunil Chabra as Milkman on bicycle
 Avijit Dutt as Julie's father
 Shasea Bahadur as Julie's brother
 Meher Chand as Goddess Sita
 Bahadur Chand as God Ram
 Puran, Sohan Lal, Meher, Amarjit Chand, and Karahm Chand as 'Ramayan' theatrical troupe members
 Kabir Chowdhury as Boy in video shop
 Laurence Côte as French tourist at the Taj Mahal

Production
The film had a budget of $800,000 and the crew deferred their salaries, worth $450,000.

Controversies and reaction
Fire was passed uncut by India's film certification board (the Central Board of Film Certification) in May 1998 with a rating of Adult, the only condition being that the character Sita's name be changed to Nita. The board made their decision based on what it called the importance of the story for Indian women. The film was first screened on 13 November 1998 and ran to full houses in 42 theaters in most metropolitan cities throughout India for almost three weeks.

On 2 December, more than 200 Shiv Sainiks stormed a Cinemax theatre in suburban Goregaon in Mumbai, smashing glass panes, burning posters and shouting slogans. They compelled managers to refund tickets to moviegoers. On 3 December, a Regal theatre in Delhi was similarly stormed. Mina Kulkarni, one of the Delhi protesters explained the reasoning behind their actions: "If women's physical needs get fulfilled through lesbian acts, the institution of marriage will collapse, reproduction of human beings will stop". Bajrang Dal workers with lathis invaded Rajpalace and Rajmahal in Surat, breaking up everything in sight and driving away frightened audiences. Some of the rioters set fire to theatres screening the film.

Theatres in Surat and Pune stopped screening the film on the same day. When attackers attempted to shut down a screening in Calcutta, however, ushers and audience fought back and the movie stayed open. Twenty-nine people were arrested in Mumbai in connection with these incidents. Chief Minister Manohar Joshi supported the actions to shut down screenings of Fire: "I congratulate them for what they have done. The film's theme is alien to our culture".

On 4 December, the film was referred back to the Certifying Board for a re-examination by the Ministry of Information and Broadcasting. The Indian government was criticised for siding with the vandals. On 5 December a group of film personalities and free speech activists, including Deepa Mehta, Indian movie star Dilip Kumar, and director Mahesh Bhatt, submitted a 17-page petition to the Supreme Court asking that a "sense of security" be provided, in addition to basic protection, so that the film could be screened smoothly. The petition referenced articles 14, 19, 21, 25 of the Indian Constitution, which promise the right to equality, life and liberty, freedom of speech and expression, freedom of conscience, free expression of religious practice and belief, and the right to hold peaceful meetings. On being asked the reason for discomfort, Dilip Kumar said that he has not seen the film and was not much concerned about its content but rather the kind of vandalism that takes place on their cultural life, whenever such issue comes up.

On 7 December, Mehta led a candlelit protest in New Delhi with activists from 32 organisations, including CALERI, against the withdrawal of Fire, carrying placards, shouting anti-Shiv Sena slogans and crying for the freedom of right to expression. On 12 December about 60 Shiv Sena men stripped down to their underwear and squatted in front of Dilip Kumar's house to protest his support of Fire. 22 were arrested and Kumar, as well as others involved in the production of the film were provided with police security.

Cinemax reopened screenings of Fire on 18 December, but a hundred members of the Bharatiya Janata Party (BJP) vandalised posters at the Sundar Theatre in Kanpur despite the police commissioner's reassurance that protection has been arranged. Fire was re-released without cuts by the Censor Board on 12 February 1999. Theatre screenings were resumed on 26 February and continued without incident.

Fire and lesbian rights in India 
Fire and the conversation that began around the movie's general reception, both by supporters and detractors, encouraged lesbians and gay rights activists in India to be more vocal about their existence and the erasure of queerness from India's historical heritage. The release of this movie corresponded with the beginning of widespread national conversation about lesbian and gay rights. A new lesbian rights group, calling themselves the Campaign for Lesbian Rights (CALERI), formed in response to the backlash. This group held their own peaceful gatherings across India.

Reception
In the weeks following its release, reviewers praised the film's explicit depiction of a homosexual relationship as "gutsy", "explosive", and "pathbreaking". Following the Shiv Sena attacks on the film, prominent party members said Fire had been targeted because it was an "immoral and pornographic" film "against Indian tradition and culture". The lesbian relationship depicted in the film was criticised as "not a part of Indian history or culture". Other politicians of the Hindu right voiced fears that the film would "spoil [Indian] women" and younger generations by teaching "happy wives not to depend on their husbands" and informing the public about "acts of perversion". Speaking on the dangers of Fire, Shiv Sena chief Bal Thackeray compared lesbianism to "a sort of a social AIDS" which might "spread like an epidemic". Furthermore, Thackery claimed that the film was an attack on Hinduism because the protagonists were named Sita and Radha, both significant goddesses in Hindu belief, and that he would withdraw his objections to the film if the names were changed to Muslim names.

A statement issued from the Shiv Sena's women's wing said: "If women's physical needs get fulfilled through lesbian acts, the institution of marriage will collapse, reproduction of human beings will stop". Critics charged the Shiv Sena of committing "cultural terrorism" and of using the rhetoric of "Indian tradition" to protest images of female independence and suppress freedom of speech: "The justification for [Shiv Sena's] action... demonstrates that Indian 'culture' for the Sangh Parivar is defined essentially in terms of male control over female sexuality".

Gay activist Ashok Row Kavi criticised the Shiv Sena's protests as "gay-bashing" and disputed their claims that lesbianism was "against Indian tradition", indicating that homosexuality is in fact abundantly present in Hinduism and that the criminalisation of homosexuality in India was a legacy of British colonial rule and Christianity. Pointing to evidence of lesbianism in Indian tradition, he said: "What's wrong in two women having sex? If they think it doesn't happen in the Indian society they should see the sculptures of Khajuraho or Konark".

Feminist critics of Mehta's films argue that Mehta's portrayal of women and gender relations is over-simplified. Noted Indian feminist authors Mary E. John and Tejaswini Niranjana wrote in 1999 that Fire reduces patriarchy to the denial and control of female sexuality. The authors make the point that the film traps itself in its own rendering of patriarchy: 
Control of female sexuality is surely one of the ideological planks on which patriarchy rests. But by taking this idea literally, the film imprisons itself in the very ideology it seeks to fight, its own version of authentic reality being nothing but a mirror image of patriarchal discourse. Fire ends up arguing that the successful assertion of sexual choice is not only a necessary but also a sufficient condition—indeed, the sole criterion—for the emancipation of women. Thus the patriarchal ideology of 'control' is first reduced to pure denial – as though such control did not also involve the production and amplification of sexuality – and is later simply inverted to produce the film's own vision of women's liberation as free sexual 'choice'. (1999:582)
Whatever subversive potential Fire might have had (as a film that makes visible the 'naturalised' hegemony of heterosexuality in contemporary culture, for example) is nullified by its largely masculinist assumption that men should not neglect the sexual needs of their wives, lest they turn lesbian (1999:583).
The authors additionally argue that viewers must ask tough questions from films such as Fire that place themselves in the realm of "alternative" cinema and aim to occupy not only aesthetic, but also political space (Economic and Political Weekly, 6–13 March 1999).

Madhu Kishwar, then-editor of Manushi, wrote a highly critical review of Fire, finding fault with the depiction of the characters in the film as a "mean spirited caricature of middle class family life among urban Indians". She claimed that homosexuality was socially accepted in India as long as it remained a private affair, adding that Mehta "did a disservice to the cause of women... by crudely pushing the Radha-Sita relationship into the lesbian mould", as women would now be unable to form intimate relationships with other women without being branded as lesbians.

Deepa Mehta expressed frustration in interviews that the film was consistently described as a lesbian film. She said "lesbianism is just another aspect of the film...Fire is not a film about lesbians", but rather about "the choices we make in life".

In 2010, veteran film critic and activist Shoni Ghosh wrote a book named Fire: A Queer Film Classic that studies in detail the movie as well the controversies ignited by the film. The book detail the situations that lead to the chaos and its aftermath.

Soundtrack

The soundtrack was composed and performed by A. R. Rahman except for tracks "Ramayan" and "Allah Hu". "Julie's Theme" and "China Town" were added as bonus tracks and were not used in the movie. A. R. Rahman reused or reworked some of his acclaimed songs from Bombay.

See also
 The Journey (2004)
 Ek Ladki Ko Dekha Toh Aisa Laga (2019)
 List of LGBT films directed by women
 Homosexuality in India
 Freedom of expression in India

References

Works cited

External links
 
 
 
 Roger Ebert's Review 
 Detailed critique of Fire 
 Analyzing feminism in Fire
 Interview with Deepa Mehta
 Queering Bollywood
 Roy, Pinaki. "Above the Quilt: Homosexuality in select Bollywood Films and Indo-Anglian Novels". Contemporary Discourse, 9.1 (January 2018): 420–23.

1996 films
English-language Indian films
English-language Canadian films
1996 LGBT-related films
1996 romantic drama films
Indian erotic drama films
Indian independent films
Films about Indian Canadians
Indian LGBT-related films
Canadian romantic drama films
Canadian erotic drama films
Canadian independent films
Canadian LGBT-related films
Films scored by A. R. Rahman
Indian feminist films
Films about adultery in India
Films about women in India
Films based on short fiction
Films directed by Deepa Mehta
Films set in Delhi
LGBT-related romantic drama films
Lesbian-related films
LGBT-related controversies in film
Obscenity controversies in film
1990s erotic drama films
Erotic romance films
1990s English-language films
1990s Canadian films